The Smithfield Exchange Bank (also known as the Resolved Waterman Tavern or Greenville Tavern), built in 1822, is located on Putnam Pike in the Greenville area of Smithfield, Rhode Island.

History
In 1733, Resolved Waterman Jr., a great-grandson of Roger Williams built a tavern to attract business from travelers on this former turnpike road. In 1822 a new owner constructed the present building, the Smithfield Exchange Bank, as an ell attached onto the back of the main tavern building. Another western ell was built onto the tavern, and the two were connected by a cobblestone courtyard. The 1822 bank incorporators were Daniel Winsor (president), Asa Winsor, Stephen Steere, Elisha Steere, Richard Smith, Silas Smith, Nathan B. Sprague, Joseph Mathewson, Dexter Irons, John S. Appleby, and Reuben Mowry. The bank originally provided services to farmers and small businesses throughout northwestern Rhode Island. In 1845 William Winsor became cashier of the institution.

In 1856 the Exchange Bank moved next door to a larger brick building. The tavern became a private residence in 1902. The main section of the Waterman Tavern was demolished in 1936 for the construction of U.S. Route 44, and the ells were altered to stand alone. The former bank ell served as a residence until 1969 for Mrs. Bessie Fish. Other owners included the Evans, Mowry, Whipple, and McLaughlin families, and Cumberland Farms. From 1969 to 2008 the building became greatly dilapidated. In 2000 Cumberland Farms sold the building to the town of Smithfield, and in 2006 it was sold to the Smithfield Preservation Society. The building was added to the National Register of Historic Places in 2006.

Restoration
As of 2009, the Smithfield Preservation Society has been fundraising and attempting to restore the tavern, despite an earlier attempt by the town of Smithfield to condemn and demolish the building because it is perceived as an eyesore by some neighbors.

Images

See also 
 National Register of Historic Places listings in Providence County, Rhode Island

References

External links
History of Smithfield Bank
PreserveRI pdf on the building info
Exchange Bank updated information

Commercial buildings completed in 1822
Buildings and structures in Smithfield, Rhode Island
Taverns in Rhode Island
Drinking establishments on the National Register of Historic Places in Rhode Island
Bank buildings on the National Register of Historic Places in Rhode Island
Commercial buildings on the National Register of Historic Places in Rhode Island
National Register of Historic Places in Providence County, Rhode Island
1822 establishments in Rhode Island